Saad Z. Hossain is a Bangladeshi author writing in English. He lives in Dhaka, Bangladesh.

His war satire, Escape from Baghdad!, was published in 2015 by Unnamed Press in the US, and Aleph in India. It was translated into French by Agullo Editions, as Bagdad la Grande Evasion. This book was a finalist for the Grand Prix de L'imaginaire 2018. 

His second book, Djinn City, was released in 2017 by Unnamed Press, Aleph Book Company, and Bengal Lights Publications. It was also published in French by Agullo Editions in October 2020, translated by Jean Francois Le Ruyet, who subsequently won the 2021 Grand Prix de L'imaginaire for his work on the book. 

His third The Gurkha and the Lord of Tuesday, was published in summer 2019 by Tor.com.
It has received critical acclaim and was a finalist for the Locus Awards as well as the IGNYTE Awards 2020 by Fiyahcon.

His fourth book, Cyber Mage was published in 2021 by Unnamed Press in the US, and ULAB Press, in Bangladesh. It is a sequel to Djinn City and Gurkha, set in Dhaka, some years in the future. 

His fifth book, Kundo Wakes Up, was published in 2022, by Tor.com. It was on the Locus reading list of best novellas for 2022, and is on the longlist for the British Science Fiction Association awards.

Reviews of his work   

His books have received great reviews, and were included in some year end lists, including Financial Times Books of the year 2015 and Tor Reviewers Choice for 2015.

Bibliography

Novels & Novellas 

 Escape from Baghdad!, Unnamed Press, 2015
 Djinn City, Unnamed Press, 2017
 The Gurkha and the Lord of Tuesday, Tor.com, 2019
 Cyber Mage, Unnamed Press, 2021
 Kundo Wakes Up, Tor.com, 2022

Selected Short Stories 

 "Djinns Live by the Sea," The Apex Book of World SF: Volume 4, Apex Publications, 2015
 "Bring Your Own Spoon," The Djinn Falls in Love and Other Stories, Solaris, 2017; The Best Science Fiction & Fantasy of the Year: Volume 12, Solaris, 2018
 "The Endless," Made to Order: Robots and Revolutions, Solaris, 2020

References 

Bangladeshi male writers
Year of birth missing (living people)
Living people
Bangladeshi science fiction writers